Prem Geet is a 2016 romantic film directed by Sudarshan Thapa in Nepal. The film was produced by Santosh Sen & Hari K C and features Pooja Sharma and Pradeep Khadka in lead roles. The film was released on Valentines Day 2015. The film met with positive responses from critics and audience. The film was a commercial success. The film marked turning point in career of the lead actor Pradeep Khadka and Pooja Sharma and made them huge stars. The movie earned much of the investment on its first week of release.

Plot
Prem (Pradeep Khadka) and Geet (Pooja Sharma) meet each other on the way to Kagbeni. Geet escaped from home because of her grandmother's continuous insistence to marry. Prem was on way due to his personal deeds but he was too pressurized to marry. Both fake their marriage to get rid of continuous insistence but ultimately fall in love then after. But their fake marriage creates problems and ultimately they separate. Both try to convince their parents but fail leading the film towards a tragic ending.

Cast
Pradeep Khadka as Prem
Pooja Sharma as geet
Saroj Khanal as Geet's father
Rupa Rana as Prem's mother
Laxmi Giri as Geet's grandmother
Norbu Tsering as hotel assistant in Mustang
Rajaram Poudel as Prem's Boss

Music

Accolades

References

2016 films
Nepalese romantic comedy films
Films shot in Kathmandu
2010s Nepali-language films